Night Mute is an album from the Bloomington, Indiana-based instrumental rock band Ativin.

Critical reception
Pitchfork wrote that "when Night Mute strives for mystery, it comes out overwrought; when it goes for dreamy, it comes off sleepy." The Coast wrote that it "has a lot to offer for repeated alone-on-a-Friday-night listens."

Track listing
 "Night Terror" – 2:20
 "Saigon Sleeps" – 3:48
 "Concentrate" – 2:01
 "Endless" – 1:54
 "Double Back" – 3:00
 "The Game" – 3:57
 "Drink This" – 3:09
 "Scout" – 3:17
 "Blood" – 1:36
 "Sleep Well" – 3:21

References

2004 albums
Secretly Canadian albums
Ativin albums